Neuvy-en-Sullias is a commune in the Loiret department located in north-central France.

See also
 Communes of the Loiret department

References

Neuvyensullias
Carnutes